Robert Shapland Crew (1752–1829) was an Irish politician.

Carew was born in Dublin and educated at  Trinity College, Dublin.

Carew represented  Waterford City from 1776 to 1800 and, after the Acts of Union, County Wexford in the British House of Commons from 1806 to 1807.

His son was the 1st Baron Carew.

References

People from Wexford, County Wexford
Irish MPs 1776–1783
Irish MPs 1783–1790
Irish MPs 1790–1797
Irish MPs 1798–1800
Members of the Parliament of Ireland (pre-1801) for County Waterford constituencies
Members of the Parliament of the United Kingdom for County Wexford constituencies (1801–1922)
Alumni of Trinity College Dublin
Politicians from Dublin (city)
UK MPs 1806–1807
1752 births
1829 deaths